Agelena atlantea is a species of spider in the family Agelenidae, which contains at least 1,315 species of funnel-web spiders . It was first described by Fage in 1938. It is commonly found in Morocco.

References

atlantea
Spiders of North Africa
Spiders described in 1938